Tommaso Bosio (died 15 August 1539) was an Italian Roman Catholic prelate who became the Bishop of Malta in 1538.

Biography
The see of Malta had been vacant for 8 years prior to Bosio's appointment. Bosio was appointed Bishop by Pope Paul III on 20 March 1538. Prior to this he served as the vice-chancellor of the Sovereign Military Order of Malta. Bosio was the first in a successive line of resident bishops in Malta, unlike some of his predecessors who choose not to live in the diocese.

He was also Inquisitor of Malta during his episcopacy. He served as bishop for a little over a year. He died on 15 August 1539.

References

Gargallo
Date of birth unknown
1539 deaths
Bosio
Bishops of Malta